Karl Anderson (born August 6, 1953) is a former American alpine skier who competed in the 1976 Winter Olympics and 1980 Winter Olympics.

Early life
Karl Anderson was born on the sixth of August 1953. He lived in Greene, Maine, and skied at Sugarloaf ski area in Carrabassett Valley.

Before Skiing Career

Skiing career

After Skiing Career

References

External links
 sports-reference.com

1953 births
Living people
American male alpine skiers
Olympic alpine skiers of the United States
Alpine skiers at the 1976 Winter Olympics
Alpine skiers at the 1980 Winter Olympics
Johnson State College alumni
20th-century American people